Create/Destroy/Create is the debut studio album by Canadian indie-rock band Goodnight, Sunrise.  It is a loose concept album divided into three movements which deal with the cyclical nature of people's lives.  The album can be played in an infinite repeated loop, because it begins and ends with a ticking clock. The album artwork features an intricate ambigram design designed by Polish artist Daniel Dostal.  The album had success on Canadian campus radio, charting with !earshot on a number of stations.

Track listing

Personnel 
 Andrew Charters - bass, backing vocals
 David Kochberg - lead vocals, guitar
 Vanessa Vakharia - lead vocals, keyboards
 Paul Weaver - drums
 Chris Sampson - engineering, production
 Noah Mintz - mastering
 Dean Marino - guitar engineering

References

External links

2013 debut albums
Goodnight, Sunrise albums